Batman: Nosferatu is a DC Comics comic book and a Batman Elseworlds publication. It is the second part of a trilogy based on German Expressionist cinema, preceded by Superman's Metropolis and succeeded by Wonder Woman: The Blue Amazon. It was written by Jean-Marc Lofficier and Randy Lofficier, and illustrated by Ted McKeever.

The story of Batman: Nosferatu is "patterned" after the classic films Metropolis, The Cabinet of Dr. Caligari and, to a lesser extent, Nosferatu: A Symphony of Horror.

Characters
DC characters which appear in the story (in order of appearance):

Bruss Wayne-son/the Nosferatu
Dirk Gray-son
Alfred Pennyworth
Dr. Arkham
Eschevin Gord-son
Chancellor Hender-son
Jimmy Ol-son
Hugo Strange
Vicki Vale
Barbera Gord-son
the Laughing Man
Lutor (flashback)
Bane
Clarc Kent-son/the Super-Man
Lois Lane
Arkham Asylum
the Penguin
the Man-Bat
Poison Ivy
Killer Croc
the Scarecrow
the Ventriloquist and Scarface

Plot
Under Clarc Kent-son and Lois Lane's enlightened rule, Metropolis has begun to progress. Some resist that progress, such as Dr. Arkham, the head of an asylum, who holds "psychomantic" seances for the entertainment of the depraved rich of Metropolis. The star of these is the "Laughing Man", a white-faced, murderous creature, a prototype cyborg built by Lutor from one of Arkham's patients.  Many other patients in the asylum are also experiments of Lutor, driven mad by his work. When Eschevin Gord-son tries to close Arkham down, the doctor sends the Laughing Man to kill him. Attorney Dirk Gray-son becomes suspicious of Arkham, but he, too, is killed by the Laughing Man. Dirk's friend, Bruss Wayne-son, and their mutual love interest Barbera Gord-son, are then drawn to investigate Arkham, after being turned down by the police and apparently ignored by the Super-Man and Lois, who have greater concerns that require their attention.

Wayne-son discovers Arkham is in league with the new Chancellor, Hender-son, and that the two are manipulating the city's aristocrats via knowledge of their secrets and the shows in the cabinet. He also hears the two plotting to kill both himself and Barbera with the Laughing Man. But during an attempted escape by the inmates in the asylum, he is captured and thrown into a great pit, at the bottom of which lie vast, sentient computers who once built Metropolis and still sustain it and watch over humanity. They turn Wayne-son into the "Nosferatu" and send him back to the city above. 

The Nosferatu saves Barbera and kills the Laughing Man, before attacking Arkham in his asylum.  As he fights the orderlies, the inmates hail him as "the Master". While confronting both Dr. Arkham and Hender-son, the latter armed with a gun scavenged from Lutor's old lair and powered by the green stone that was taken from Lutor's chest, the Super-Man appears to investigate at Wayne-son's behest and is wounded by the weapon before the Nosferatu hurls Hender-son from the tower.

He is then confronted by the Super-Man, who believes there is no place for creatures of shadow in his city of light, while the Nosferatu calls him naïve and claims the inmates as his responsibility. They fight, eventually falling down into the Underworld. Their battle is inconclusive, with each mortally wounding the other.  However, the ancient computers reveal themselves to the Super-Man and he realizes that there can be no light without shadows. The Nosferatu's job is to catch these shadows. The computers restore both combatants and the Super-Man accepts the Nosferatu's control over the night. Bruss Wayne-son ends up in charge of the asylum where Arkham is now a patient, trying to convince anyone who will listen that the new director is the Nosferatu.

Publication
 Batman: Nosferatu (64 pages, 1999)

Trilogy
This is the second part of a trilogy:

Superman's Metropolis
Batman: Nosferatu
Wonder Woman: The Blue Amazon

Writer Jean-Marc Lofficier had a fourth and final book planned, entitled The Green Light, which would have introduced counterparts of Green Lantern, the Flash and the Martian Manhunter (based on Leni Riefenstahl's Das Blaue Licht (U.S. title: The Blue Light (1932)) and Arnold Fanck's Der Weiße Rausch - Der Neue Wunder des Schneeschuhs (U.S. title: The White Ecstasy (1931)) (which also starred Leni Riefenstahl)), and a female version of Aquaman (based on Georg Wilhelm Pabst's Die Herrin von Atlantis (U.S. title: The Mistress of Atlantis) (1932)). The book would have dealt with the rediscovery of Earth, but it was never published and remains so to this day.

See also
 List of Elseworlds publications

References

External links
 The Lofficiers' page on Batman: Nosferatu

Elseworlds titles
Nosferatu
Gothic comics